Malik al-Hassan Yakubu is a member of the Pan-African Parliament from Ghana. He is a Ghanaian politician and a Member of parliament for the Yendi constituency. He was previously Minister of Interior, but resigned in 2002 amid accusations of backing one of the sides in a violent conflict in Yendi.

Early life and education 
He was born on 29 December 1945.He attended the University of Cape Coast, University of Ghana and the Ghana School of Law.

Career 
Malik is a farmer.

Politics 
He assumed office on the ticket of New Patriotic Party in 2004. He won by attaining 15,302 votes i.e. 53.50% of the total votes cast.

Politics 
Malik was a member of parliament for the fourth  parliament of the fourth republic of Ghana. He was elected into members of parliament during the 2004 Ghanaian parliamentary elections on the tickets of the New Patriotic Party with a total votes cast of 15,302 representing 53.50% whiles his opponent, Sulemana Ibn Iddrisu Jnr. of the National Democratic Congress polled 10,779 of the total vote cast representing 37.70%, Nalari Nyoja John of the People's National Convention polled 2,500 which also represent 8.70% of the total votes cast and Zuututugri Mubarak Abdallah and independent candidate had no votes of 0  0.00%.

Malik was also a Minister for Interior during the regime of His Excellency the Ex-President of the republic of Ghana John Agyekum Kufour but in the year 2002 he resigned amid accusations of backing one of two feuding clans involved in the fighting in Yendi, a region in the Northern part of Ghana. He was also the Second Deputy Speaker of parliament.

He was elected into the 2nd parliament of the 4th republic of Ghana on 7 January 1997 after being pronounced winner at the 1996 Ghanaian General Elections. He defeated Sulemana Ibn Iddrisu, Jnr. of the National Democratic Congress by obtaining 47.60% of the total valid votes which is equivalent to 13,743 votes while Sulemana obtained 24.60% which is 7,107 votes in equivalence.

References

External links
 "Ghanaian ministers resign over king's death", BBC News, 30 March 2002, retrieved 15 July 2016.

Living people
Members of the Pan-African Parliament from Ghana
Interior ministers of Ghana
New Patriotic Party politicians
Ghanaian Muslims
Ghanaian Ahmadis
University of Cape Coast alumni
University of Ghana alumni
Ghana School of Law alumni
1945 births
Government ministers of Ghana
Ghanaian agriculturalists
Ghanaian MPs 2001–2005
People from Northern Region (Ghana)
Ghanaian MPs 1997–2001
Tamale Senior High School alumni